Murray S. Waas is an American independent investigative journalist best known for his coverage of the White House planning for the 2003 invasion of Iraq and ensuing controversies and American political scandals such as the Plame affair (also known as the "CIA leak grand jury investigation", the "CIA leak scandal", and "Plamegate"). For much of his career, Waas focused on national security reporting, but has also written about social issues and corporate malfeasance. His articles about the second Iraq war and Plame affair matters have appeared in \National Journal, where he has worked as a staff correspondent and contributing editor, The Atlantic, and, earlier The American Prospect.

Waas also comments on contemporary American political controversies in his personal blogs Whatever Already! and at The Huffington Post. An "instant book", the United States v. I. Lewis Libby, which he edited, with research assistance by Jeff Lomonaco, was published by Union Square Press (an imprint of Sterling Publishing) in June 2007.

Personal history
Waas was born in Philadelphia, Pennsylvania, and originally hoped to have a career in law and city politics ("To be the district attorney and mayor of the City of Philadelphia"), but he dropped out of George Washington University before graduating.
 
In 1987, when Waas was only twenty-six years old, he learned that he had a life-threatening "advanced form" of cancer. On June 26, 2006, Washington Post media writer Howard Kurtz disclosed that Waas had been told that he had an "incurable Stage C" cancer and faced a "terminal diagnosis."

Subsequently, Waas successfully sued the George Washington University Medical Center, which had negligently "failed to diagnose his cancer."  Waas won a $650,000 verdict in the case. The verdict, in turn, was later upheld by the D.C. Court of Appeals." Although, according to a report prepared by a pathologist who testified in the case, "over 90% of [such] patients... are dead within two years," Waas survived and was later declared "cancer-free."-- his recovery and survival later described as a miracle by the physicians treating him.  In winning the appeal of the jury's verdict by the hospital, the appeals court devised new case law expanding the rights of cancer patients and ordinary patients to sue and seek justice through the courts because of medical mistakes.

Although he initially shied away from writing about health care because of his history as a cancer survivor, in 2009 and 2010, Waas weighed in with a series of articles for Reuters, detailing how many of the nation's largest health insurance companies, improperly, and even illegally, canceled the policies of tens of thousands of policyholders shortly after they were diagnosed with HIV, cancer, and other life-threatening but costly diseases. One story disclosed that the nation's then largest health insurer, WellPoint, using a computer algorithm, identified women recently diagnosed with breast cancer and then singled them out for cancellation of their policies, without a legitimate cause to do so. The story not only caused considerable and immediate public outrage, but led Secretary of Health and Human Services, Kathleen Sebelius, and President Barack Obama, to call on WellPoint to end the practice.

Pressured by the Obama administration, WellPoint and the nation's other largest health insurers agreed to immediately end the practice. Waas was credited with saving the lives of countless other cancer patients like himself, and making sure that tens of thousands of other people did not have their insurance unfairly canceled. He won the Barlett & Steele Award for Business Investigative Reporting from the Walter Cronkite School of Journalism and Mass Communication of Arizona State University as well as other honors for the stories.

Professional career
While still attending college, Waas began working for American newspaper columnist Jack Anderson. His journalistic work has since been published in such publications and outlets as The New Yorker, The Atlantic,The Los Angeles Times, The New York Times, The Guardian. The Boston Globe, The Washington Post, McClatchy Newspapers, Reuters, the Associated Press, ABC News, The New York Review of Books, New York Magazine, Foreign Policy, Vox, Harper's, The New Republic, The American Prospect, The Nation, and The Village Voice.
 
In his twenties, Waas was a staff writer for The Village Voice.  The current masthead of the Voice lists Waas as a "Contributors Emeritus" to the newspaper, along with such other writers, critics, investigative reporters, and cartoonists who worked for the paper during the same era, such as Wayne Barrett, Jack Newfield, Teresa Carpenter, Ron Rosenbaum, the late Norman Mailer, Mim Udovitch, Matt Groening and Mark Alan Stamaty.

Waas first worked for columnist Anderson at age 18, the summer of his freshman year of college: "When I went out for interviews, the subjects took one look at me and just laughed... I was one of those 18-year-old kids who looked 15," he once recalled.

In an obituary of Anderson, The New York Times wrote that Anderson's column was "the nation's most widely read, longest-running political column." Anderson himself liked to boast that he and his relatively small staff had done daily "what Bob Woodward and Carl Bernstein did just once when they dug out the truth of the Watergate scandal."

In his own appreciation of Anderson, which Waas published in The Village Voice, after the columnist's death at the age of 83, Waas noted that columns he wrote for Anderson advocating that economic sanctions be imposed against the Ugandan regime of Idi Amin, were believed to have led to the sanctions being enacted into law, which in turn, resulted in the overthrow of Amin's genocidal regime.

Ralp Nurnberger, a former staffer on the Senate Foreign Relations Committee, and professor at Georgtown University, later concluded in a study for the African Studies Review that the economic sanctions imposed against Amin by the U.S. likely led to Amin's downfall. 
Nurnberger wrote that the congressional initiative to impose the sanctions had attracted scant attention or support outside a small number of members of Congress and congressional staff interested in the matter until "Jack Anderson assigned one of his reporters, Murray Waas to follow the issue" and to write regularly about it. 

Waas wrote a dozen columns about U.S. companies doing business with the Amin regime and advocating for the imposition of economic sanctions. Nurnberger wrote that Waas "served as a useful contact for the congressional staff investigating this subject as well as Uganda expatriates."

The tremendous reach of Anderson's column amplified Waas' reporting on Amin and his advocacy of sanctions, without which the sanctions legislation would have been unlike to have caused the overthrow of the Amin regime. At the time, Anderson's columns were published in more than 1,000 newspapers, which in turn had 40 million readers. Waas was eighteen and nineteen years old at the time he wrote the series of columns.

Prior to his overthrow from power, Amin had been alleged to have engaged in genocide and killed between 150,000 and 500,000 of his own citizens. The late Sen. Frank Church (D-Id.), a chairman of the Senate Foreign Committee, later said the congressionally imposed boycott "had a profound impact on the internal conditions [inside Uganda] and contributed to the fall of Idi Amin." Sen. Mark Hatfield (R-Or.), commented that the sanctions "provided the psychological and practical ingredients to complete a formula that would come to break Amin's seemingly invincible survivability."

In an article about the sanctions, published in 2003, Foreign Policy magazine concluded that the U.S. imposed trade embargo "proved devastating to the Ugandan economy" and that "they helped set in motion the events that led to the fall of the regime."

During the Reagan administration, Waas was among a small group of reporters involved in breaking the story of the Iran-Contra affair.

Waas won an Alicia Patterson Journalism Fellowship in 1992 to research and write about the rights of the institutionalized and incarcerated in the U.S. For his fellowship, he investigated substandard conditions and questionable deaths at institutions for the mentally retarded, mental hospitals, nursing homes, juvenile detention centers, and jails and prisons.

As part of his work for the Alicia Patterson Foundation, Waas published a 7,912 word article in the Los Angeles Times on April 3, 1994, detailing how mentally retarded children institutionalized by the District of Columbia government had died because of abuse and neglect. The story led to renewed scrutiny by the U.S. Department of Justice of the city's treatment of its mentally retarded wards and spurred on the settlement of a civil suit brought against the city government by the parents of several children who had died due to abuse or neglect.

In 1998 and 1999, Waas reported on Whitewater and the Clinton impeachment for Salon.com.

Following the presidency of George Herbert Walker Bush, in 1993, while a reporter for the Los Angeles Times, Waas, along with his Los Angeles Times colleague Douglas Frantz, was a finalist for the Pulitzer Prize in the category of national reporting for his stories detailing that administration's prewar foreign policy towards the Iraqi regime of Saddam Hussein That same year, Waas was also a recipient of the Goldsmith Prize for Investigative Reporting, awarded by the Joan Shorenstein Barone Center on The Press, of the John F. Kennedy School of Government of Harvard University, for "a series that detailed United States policy toward Iraq before the Persian Gulf war".

As part of that reporting, on March 10, 1992, Waas and Frantz disclosed that the Reagan and George H.W. Bush administrations had engaged in secret intelligence sharing with Saddam Hussein's Iraqi regime, despite falsely telling the congressional intelligence committees that all such cooperation had ended two years earler.

In another story, published on April 18, 1992, Waas and Frantz, citing highly classified government records, first reported that the Reagan and George H. W. Bush administrations, for more than a decade, had engaged in a covert policy of allowing Saudi Arabia to transfer American arms to Saddam's Hussein's Iraq. The story further alleged that both presidents Ronald Reagan and Georg H.W. Bush had secretly encouraged the arms transfers even though they likely violated federal law and Congressional restrictions.

Also in 1992, Waas disclosed in an investigative story in The Los Angeles Times that the George H. W. Bush administration had allowed Pakistan to purchase American made weapons, despite a federal law then in place prohibiting such sales unless the President were to certify to Congress that "Pakistan does not possess a nuclear explosive device."  (At the time, Pakistan maintained a nuclear arsenal; the Bush administration had not certified that Pakistan was nuclear free). The June, 18, 1992 article led several Senators to charge that Bush administration was violating federal law by allowing for the arms sales.  The late Senator John Glenn, Democrat of Ohio, said that even though the  arms ban "was signed by the President into law... his [own] Administration took steps not to comply with it."   Then-Senator Claiborne Pell, Republican of Rhode Island, and then the chairman of the powerful Senate Foreign Services Committee, reacted to Waas' story by firmly asserting that the Bush State Department "has knowingly violated federal law by permitting" the arms sales to Pakistan.

More recently, Waas worked as a national correspondent and contributing editor of National Journal.

Summarizing the stories that Waas wrote for National Journal during 2005 and 2006 about the second Bush administration's policies that led up to war with Iraq, The Washington Post online White House columnist Dan Froomkin, wrote on March 31, 2006 wrote that Waas' articles presented a "compelling narrative about how President Bush and his top aides contrived their bogus case for war in Iraq."

While writing numerous stories about the second Bush administration's policies that led up to war with Iraq, Waas was simultaneously reporting about the investigation of CIA leak prosecutor Patrick J. Fitzgerald's investigation as to who leaked covert CIA operative Valerie Plame's identity to the press—illustrating in his reporting how the two stories were inextricably linked in that the effort to damage Plame was part of a broader Bush White House effort to discredit those who were alleging that it had misrepresented intelligence information to make the case to go to war.

Plame's identity as a covert CIA agent was leaked to the media by senior Bush White House officials to discredit and retaliate against her husband, former Ambassador Joseph C. Wilson IV, who had alleged the Bush administration misrepresented intelligence information to make the case to go to war with Saddam Hussein. I. Lewis (Scooter) Libby, the chief of staff to Vice President Dick Cheney, was later convicted on federal charges of perjury and obstruction of justice in an attempt to conceal his own role and that of others in the Bush White House in outing Plame, although President Bush would later commute Libby's thirty-month prison sentence. (President Bush's then chief political adviser, Karl Rove, was investigated by the special prosecutor, Patrick Fitzgerald, as well, but not charged.)  Waas not only wrote the first story disclosing that it was Libby who had leaked Plame's identity to New York Times reporter Judith Miller, but the same story also paved the way for Miller, then in jail for more than a hundred days, for refusing to identify Libby as his source, to be released and testify against Libby.

In an August 6, 2005 story in the American Prospect, Waas first disclosed that it was Libby who had first provided Plame's name to Miller.

That same story also disclosed that Libby was encouraging Miller to stay in jail and not reveal that Libby was her source.  After reading Waas' story, prosecutor Fitzgerald wrote a letter to Libby's attorney, citing Waas' reporting, demanding that Libby encourage Miller to finally testify.  Fitzgerald wrote in the letter that "Libby had simply decided that encouraging Ms. Miller to testify was not in his best interest", that Libby discouraging Miller to testify so as to thwart the special counsel's investigation might be possibly construed as an obstruction of justice or witness tampering.. As a result, Libby then wrote and called Miller saying that it was alright for her to testify. After spending more than a hundred days in jail, Miller was released, whereupon she provided testimony and evidence to prosecutors against Libby, directly leading to Libby's indictment, and subsequent conviction, on multiple federal criminal charges of obstruction of justice and perjury. Washington Post media columnist Howard Kurtz wrote on April 17, 2006, that Waas' account "set in motion the waiver springing Miller from jail on contempt charges."

Regarding these same stories on the Plame case, as well as his earlier stories on the misrepresentation of intelligence information by the Bush administration to take the U.S. to war with Iraq, New York University journalism professor and press critic Jay Rosen wrote that Waas had the promise to be his generation's ""new Bob Woodward": Rosen wrote that the most significant story of that time was how Bushh and top aides hadd "deceptively drove the nation to war" and that Waas had emerged as the leading reporter on that story.

Several of Waas's later published accounts of that aspect of the Plame affair informed his Union Square Press book on the Libby trial published in June 2007, which he discusses in some detail in his interview with Amy Goodman on Democracy Now!.

During the final days of the 2012 presidential campaign, Waas wrote a series of articles for the Boston Globe detailing how Mitt Romney, as governor of Massachusetts, had implemented policies to restrict the rights of the state's LGBT community, as a way to curry favor with conservative and evangelical voters who vote in large numbers in the Republican presidential primaries. Among those policies, Waas wrote, Romney had refused to grant birth certificates to the children of same sex parents. State records obtained by Waas showed that a senior Department of Public Health lawyer warned in a confidential memo to her superiors warning that the Romney administration's failure to provide birth certificates to these children would constitute "'violations of existing statutes,' impair law enforcement and security efforts in a post 9/11 world, and would cause the children to encounter difficulties later in life as they tried to register for school, obtain a driver's license or a passport, enlist in the military, or even vote."

The reaction to the Waas stories on Romney was swift, as civil rights and LGBT groups condemned him—- in the days just prior to the election. Chad Griffin, the president of the Human Rights Campaign, the nation's largest gay-rights advocacy organization, said in a statement: "Mitt Romney has stood before the American people multiple times and said he does not support discrimination against LGBT people – and that is an outright lie.’’ Griffin further commented that by "denying birth certificates to children [of same sex parents]... Romney has undertaken to disenfranchise LGBT people.’’

During the Trump administration, Waas was one of the first reporters to write about efforts by the National Enquirer, its parent company, American Media, Inc., and President Trump's then-personal attorney and fixer, Michael Cohen, to pay hush money to women with whom Trump had extramarital affairs.

Also during the Trump administration, Waas broke more than two dozen significant stories regarding special counsel Robert Mueller's investigation, focusing primarily on whether President Trump obstructed justice. These various stories primarily appeared in The New York Review of Books, The New York Times, Vox, and Foreign Policy.

Waas broke the very first story disclosing that former FBI Director James Comey had corroboratory witnesses when it came to Comey's allegations that President Trump ordered him to shut down an FBI investigation into whether his then National Security Advisor Micheal Flynn had lied to the FBI about his conversations with a Russian diplomat, while Trump and Comey were completely alone in the Oval Office, on February 14, 2017. Special Counsel Mueller investigated Comey's allegations as a potential obstruction of justice by Trump.

Prior to Waas' story, Trump and his political supporters, had argued that Trump could not credibly face any serious legal jeopardy, for obstruction of justice, as a result of Comey's allegations, because the evidence against Trump was solely based on Comey's word-- the word of an FBI Director who had only been recently fired versus that of the President of the United States. "We have to keep in mind that is one person's record of what happened," Republican National Committee Chair Ronna Romney McDaniel said on Fox News in one typical such comment repeated by Trump White House surrogates. "The only two people who know what happened in these meetings are the president and James Comey.""

But in a June 7, 2017 report which appeared in  Vox, Waas disclosed that Comey had contemporaneously spoke at length with three of his top aides about the president ordering him to shut down the FBI investigation of Flynn. In his story, Waas disclosed those officials to be Andrew McCabe, then the FBI's Acting Director (and the FBI's Deputy Director during the time he had spoken with Comey); Jim Rybicki, Comey's chief of staff; and James Baker, the FBI's then-General Counsel. Waas also wrote that more than one of the senior FBI officials also made contemporaneous notes of their conversations with Comey regarding Trump's obstruction of justice.  The Trump White House denied that this could have been true, asserting that Comey could not have told his three aides about something that never happened in the first place. But Comey himself confirmed that this indeed was case when he testified to the Senate Intelligence Committee the following day, in response to questions prompted by the Waas story.

Waas also was also one of the first reporters to disclose how President Trump attempted to exploit the U.S. Department of Justice to improperly investigate his perceived political enemies. On November 9, 2018, Waas reported in Vox that then-Acting Attorney General Matthew Whitaker had privately advised Trump as to how the Justice Department might be exploited to investigate Trump's political adversaries.  Whitaker counseled Trump as to how a special counsel could be named to investigate Hillary Clinton, Waas wrote.  Clinton had earlier been cleared by an earlier FBI investigation of whether she used a private email server while disseminating classified information; there was no new information that had come to light that Clinton had done anything to break the law when Trump pressured the DOJ to investigate Trump.

On November 20, The New York Times, citing Waas' and Vox's original reporting, published it own story reporting that its own sources had independently confirmed that Trump had pressured Whitaker and senior Justice Department officials to investigate Hillary Clinton. The Times story, however, went even further, disclosing that Trump ordered his then-White House Counsel, Don McGahn, to prosecute  Hillary Clinton and James Comey, even if there was no real evidence that either did anything wrong. McGahn was so distressed by Trump's demands, The Times reported, that the White House Counsel warned the president in a memo that Trump might face "possible impeachment" if he persisted with such efforts.

Based on the disclosures by the Vox and The New York Times reports, Senate Majority Leader, Charles Schumer, Democrat of New York, requested that the Justice Department's Inspector General investigate Whitaker's conduct. Schumer in particular asked the Inspector General to investigate allegations "by veteran journalist Murray Waas [in Vox, which] revealed that Whitaker.. was counseling the White House on how the president might pressure Sessions and Deputy Attorney General Rod Rosenstein to direct the Justice Department to investigate Trump's enemies." Schumer also asked the Justice Department in his letter to investigate whether, Whitaker, while Acting Attorney General "may have shared with the White House... confidential grand jury or investigative information from the Special Counsel investigation."

In 2019, Waas broke numerous other exclusive stories for Vox and The New York Review of Books about the impeachment investigation of President Trump. At issue were allegations that President Trump pressured the Ukrainian government to announce an investigation of Joe Biden's son, Hunter, for alleged illicit business deals in Ukraine.  At the time, Joseph Biden was Trump's most likely Democratic opponent in the 2022 election. Trump allegedly threatened Ukrainian president Volodymyr Zelensky withheld almost $400 million in U.S. military assistance to Ukraine until Zelensky agreed to announce such the inquiry.

In 2019 and 2020, Waas wrote a series of articles in The New York Review of Books and The Guardian detailing new allegations the politicization and corruption of the Department of Justice during the Trump administration.

In 2021 and 2022, Waas wrote a series of investigative stories about the attorneys working on behalf of then president Donald Trump, attempted to overturn the results of the 2020 presidential election.

In a Dec. 2, 2021 article in The Guardian, Waas disclosed that one of the lead attorneys in that effort, Sidney Powell, had on multiple occasions represented to federal courts hearing her cases that various people were either her co-counsel or the plaintiffs in her cases without seeking their permission to ado so. Several of these peoople told Waas that they only learned that Powell had named them only after cases were already filed." On the very next day, Waas wrote another about Powell disclosing that a federal grand jury was investigating both her and a non-profit she headed for fundraising fraud.

In a rare interview about his work, on May 15, 2006, with Elizabeth Halloran, of U.S. News & World Report, when she asked whether he was "working on stories other than those involving the Fitzgerald investigation," Waas indicated that he has "been working on a long, explanatory piece about healthcare issues, the cervical cancer vaccine." Among the questions that he raised with Halloran are: "Why isn't that vaccine going to get to the people it should get to? Is it going to be locked away?"

Asked during the same interview by Halloran why Waas had chosen not only not to appear on cable television shows, but had also been known to decline to go on such shows as Nightline and Meet the Press, he responded: "There's not much of it that really enlightens us. There are journalists who don't do journalism anymore. They go on television; they're blogging; they're giving speeches; they're going to parties. And then at the end of the week they've had four or five hours devoted to journalism."

Waas also told Halloran:

An acquaintance of mine, [Doonesbury cartoonist] Garry Trudeau, went a long time without going on TV, and we talked about having a 12-step program for people who appear on television too much. It would be a boom business in Washington. But Garry has lapses – he's been on Nightline, Charlie Rose. I also believe he did a morning show one time. But I've been steadfast. I have not been broken. I thought it was me and Garry against the world, the two amigos. He's left me hanging out there.

Waas similarly told Washington Post media writer Howard Kurtz, who had nicknamed Waas "The Lone Ranger": "If my journalism has had impact, it has been because I have spent more time in county courthouses than greenrooms," Claude Lewis, a member of the editorial board of The Philadelphia Inquirer wrote in a profile of the journalist that his low-key approach had proved to be effective: "His quiet and sometimes unorthodox manner is disarming... But he is an intelligent and intense digger, who checks and double-checks his facts.", Lewis wrote.

Book publication
The United States v. I. Lewis Libby, edited and with reporting by Waas, was published by Sterling Publishing's Union Square Press imprint on June 5, 2007.

The bulk of the book was an edited version of the trial transcript of the federal criminal trial of I. Lewis Libby, carefully culled from its original size of nearly a million words. The book also included an original essay written by Waas, entitled "The Last Compartment", which contained new information and reporting.

The book's editor and publisher told USA Today that the book was an attempt to be "like the published reports from the 9/11 Commission and the Iraq Study Group" in both thoroughness and accuracy, providing additional context to the original documentary record, and adding new reporting and information.

Reviewing the book in the Columbia Journalism Review, James Boylan, a contributing editor of the magazine, wrote for its November/December 2007 issue, wrote that Waas shed light on not only on the Plame affair, but also the "foibles of a cohort of Washington's current insider journalists" whose  mistakes helped cause the scandal.

Notable assessments of Waas's journalism
Murray Waas's reporting on the administration of George W. Bush—especially with regard to the Bush administration's misrepresentation of intelligence to take the nation to war, and the Plame affair—has been called "groundbreaking" by New York University journalism Professor Jay Rosen, who considers Waas the "new Bob Woodward". "By Woodward Now," Rosen wrotes of Waas: "I mean the reporter who is actually doing what Woodward has a reputation for doing: finding, tracking, breaking into reportable parts—and then publishing—the biggest story in town."

On October 27, 1992, the late David Shaw, then a staff writer for the Los Angeles Times who won a Pulitzer Prize for Criticism the previous year, assessed the reporting by his colleagues Murray Waas and Douglas Frantz on the first Bush administration's prewar policy towards Iraq leading up to the first Gulf War, noted that the reporters wrote more than 100 stores on the subject based on thousands of pages of classified government papers.  The article quoted the observation of Leonard Downie, the-then executive editor of The Washington Post, that his own newspaper was "slow in getting up to speed on that story, in part because it's the kind of story involving careful work with documents ... Once you're behind, it takes a while to catch up." Downie credits the Los Angeles Times with "pav[ing] the way," saying that that is "why we began pursuing it after really not noticing it from the outset."

Based in part o those same stories by Waas and Frantz, ABC News Nightline anchor Ted Koppel told his viewers that it was "increasingly clear...that George Bush, operating largely behind the scenes throughout the 1980s, initiated and supported much of the financing, intelligence, and military help that built Saddam's Iraq into the aggressive power that the United States ultimately had to destroy."  Media critic Russ Baker praised their reporting in the Columbia Journalism Review,. observing that their stories were "admirably, light on anonymous sources and heavy on information from [classified] documents."

Baker further pointed out that Waas had earlier been one of only a handful of reporters who had written about the covert Reagan and Bush administration's covert foreign policies leading up to hostilities with Iraq, prior to the war itself. Baker noted that the Village Voice on Dec. 18, 1990 "published a major investigation" by Waas demonstrating that George Bush was a behind-the-scenes advocate of a pro-Iraq tilt," during and after the Iran-Iraq war.

During the presidential administration of William Jefferson Clinton, Waas wrote some of the very first investigative stories critical of Whitewater Independent Counsel Kenneth Starr. Some conservative media outlets, among them, the now defunct Weekly Standard and the editorial pages of the Wall Street Journal, as well as the late conservative syndicated columnist, Robert Novak, harshly criticized his reporting of both Starr's investigation and the resulting impeachment saga. The Journal's editorial page disparaged his stories for primarily appearing in "an Internet magazine called Salon (paid circulation zip)." Washington Post media critic Howard Kurtz wrote, however, that "what has infuriated the president's detractors is that Waas... and his colleagues are starting to draw blood. The Justice Department has asked Starr to investigate the allegation of [illicit] payments to [one of Starr's own key witnesses]."  Kurtz further noted that Waas' stories were picked up both The New York Times. and The Washington Post."  And in sharp contrast, media critics writing for the Online Journalism Review, the American Journalism Review, and The Washington Post, praised the very same reporting. In The Washington Post, columnist John Schwartz wrote that reporting by Waas and his colleagues as Salon was "one crucial element that keeps guys like me coming back: investigative reporting." Schwartz explained: "This [past] year... Salon dove into investigative reporting, the hard digging that can yield amazing things. They chose one of the biggest stories around: the continuing scandals surrounding the Clinton administration."

In June 1998, J.D. Lasica published "The Web: A New Channel for Investigative Journalism", a "sidebar" to his article entitled "Salon: The Best Pure-Play Web Publication?", published in American Journalism Review, assessing reporting on the Impeachment of Bill Clinton in Salon.com by Waas and his colleagues, noted: "For some time now, the mainstream media have taken shots at the Internet for allowing anyone to spread rumors, lies and conspiracy theories to a global audience of millions." Lasica wrote that Waas' reporting for Salon had reversed that situation, in that his reporting wass an example of the Internet "becoming an alternative channel for original investigative journalism" and publishing important stories originally given little attention by mainstream news organizations.

Lasica further observed that "Salon's coverage of the Clinton-Lewinsky matter— was one of the "first sustained foray into classic investigative journalism" by an Internet publication.  Lasica said the reporting often also "served as a counterweight" to the mainstream media's wolfpack mindset."  Andrew Ross, (then-managing editor of Salon) said that he believed "Salon's investigative journalism ... has raised old media's hackles because, Ross says, it was done the old-fashioned way: shoe leather, cultivating sources, working the phones—no new-media tricks here." Indeed, Lasica noted that Waas was [at that time] "a bit of a technophobe" who had not previously gone online much. Waas said that he wrote for Salon because 'I like the daily rhythm and the immediacy.'"  David Weir, a cofounder of the Center for Investigative Reporting and journalism professor at the University of California at Berkeley, told the journalism review that the reporting of Waas and his colleagues represented a "breakthrough" for a news site on the Web. "This was the first time we’ve seen an Internet news organization dig out an important national story that the rest of the media missed." Waas was the winner in 1998 of the Society of Professional Journalists Award for Depth Reporting for his coverage of Whitewater and the impeachment crisis.

In the Online Journalism Review, Matt Welch commented, that "web-only journalism [had] officially graduated to the Beltway's radar screen" due to stories written by Waas and two other Salon reporters, the results of which were that  "Kenneth Starr's key Whitewater witness David Hale has suffered a serious blow to his credibility, and the independent counsel himself has been forced to fend off conflict-of-interest questions from the Justice Department."

On April 17, 2006, then-Washington Post media critic Howard Kurtz, published a profile of Waas describing him at times both elusive and a serious journalist. Despite Waas having "racked up a series of scoops" for over a quarter-century, Kurtz wrote, the reporter preferred to remain in the "journalistic shadows" and wasn't apt to "toot his own horn." Kurtz further noted that Waas "only reluctantly granted an interview" for his profile of the reporter.  Waas told Kurtz that many reporters were only pursuing stories "to get "television appearances or million-dollar book contracts, it is difficult for us to play our proper role... My theory is, avoid the limelight, do what's important and leave your mark. . . . If my journalism has had impact, it has been because I have spent more time in county courthouses than greenrooms."

In the summer of 2006, writing in Nieman Reports, Jim Boyd, former deputy editorial page editor of the Minneapolis Star-Tribune for twenty-four years, prepared an "exclusive list" of newspaper reporters whom he considered "courageous," including among them Waas. 

In July 2007, GQ Magazine named Waas as one of four of "The Best Reporters You Don't Know About," writing about him: "Years of groundbreaking watchdog journalism have resulted in this nickname: the new Bob Woodward."  The magazine cited his pieces on the Plame leak investigation and the firings of U.S. attorneys by the Bush administration as to examples of notable work.

In 2009, Eric Alterman and Danielle Ivory, wrote for the website of the Center for American Progress that it was becoming "increasingly evident every day... [that] Internet-based reporters are increasingly setting priorities for the national news agenda". citing as one example Waas' role in "unearthing the truth about the outing of Valerie Plame." (Waas primarily broke his stories on the Plame affair on the websites of National Journal and the American Prospect, and earlier on his personal blog, when there was scant interest by the Washington establishment in the story.)

Twice in 2010, Ryan Chittum of the Columbia Journalism Review wrote columns praising Waas' investigations of the U.S. health insurance industry. On March 17, 2010 Chittum wrote that Waas had conducted an "eye-opening investigation" demonstrating that, Assurant a major health-insurance company, had "systematically targeted sick patients... [to] find technicalities to dump them."   On April 22, 2010, Chittum praised Reuters and Waas for publishing a story documenting how Wellpoint, the nation's largest health insure, had "systematically targeted customers with breast cancer to find excuses to drop their coverage."

Investigation of the U.S. health insurance industry

On the eve of the historic health reform vote in Congress, on March 17, 2010, Reuters published a story, based on a months long investigation by Waas, detailing how one of the nation's largest insurance companies, Assurant, had a policy of targeting all policyholders recently diagnosed with HIV for cancelation. The story asserted that the company utilized an algorithm  which then "searched for any pretext to revoke their policy" on "the flimsiest of evidence."

The Obama administration and members of Congress cited the report as a reason health care reform was necessary. In a column appearing only a few nights before the vote, following up on his own blog post on the same subject from two days earlier, New York Times columnist Paul Krugman wrote that the actions of Assurant were representative of the "vileness of our current system" and illustrated why reform was necessary."

After passage of the health reform bill, Reuters followed up, with another story by Waas on April 23, 2010, disclosing that WellPoint, the nation's largest health insurance company, had similarly targeted policyholders with breast cancer, shortly after their diagnoses. The Reuters story asserted that WellPoint utilized "a computer algorithm that automatically targeted ... every other policyholder recently diagnosed with breast cancer. The software triggered an immediate fraud investigation, as the company searched for some pretext to drop their policies."

An earlier investigation by the House Energy and Commerce Committee had determined that WellPoint (now Anthem), Assurant, and UnitedHealth Group, had made at least $300 million by improperly rescinding more than 19,000 policyholders over one five-year period.."

A Wellpoint executive testified before the committee that the company only engaged in rescission as a means of "stopping fraud and material misrepresentation that contributes to spiraling health care costs."  But as Waas reported in his story, federal and state regulators could find virtually no instances in which a patient's policy has been legitimately canceled.  Waas wrote:

A 2007 investigation by the California Department of Managed Health Care bore this out. The agency randomly selected 90 instances in which Anthem Blue Cross of California dropped the insurance of policyholders after diagnoses with costly or life-threatening illnesses to determine how many were legally justified.

None were. “In all 90 files, there was no evidence (that Blue Cross), before rescinding coverage, investigated or established that the applicant’s omission/misrepresentation was willful,” the DMHC report said.

The Waas story garnered immediate attention. Published not only on Reuters' website, one of the nation's most highly trafficked news sites, it also appeared on seven other of the ten most highly read news sites—those of The New York Times, The Washington Post, Yahoo News, ABC News, NBC News, MSNBC, and The Huffington Post.

On April 23, 2010, Secretary of Health and Human Services Kathleen Sebelius wrote Wellpoint's CEO, Angela Braly, to say that Wellpoint's actions were "deplorable" and "unconscionable," and called on the company to "immediately cease these practices." Speaker of the U.S. House of Representatives Nancy Pelosi weighed in as well after reading the story, saying: "Americans who are fighting for their lives should not have to fight for their health insurance."

President Obama, whose late mother had problems and disagreements with her own insurance carrier before she died from ovarian cancer, followed up on May 8, 2010, by severely criticizing WellPoint for the practice in his weekly radio address.

As a result of both the public reaction to the story as well as intense pressure from the Obama administration, WellPoint agreed to voluntarily end such practices only a week after Waas' story appeared. The nation's other largest health insurance companies only days later followed suit.

Praising the reform, The New York Times editorial page said in a May 2, 2010 editorial:

Americans are already starting to see the benefits of health care reform ... In recent days insurers and their trade association have rushed to announce that they will end rescissions immediately ... 

The insurers decided to act quickly after they were whacked by some very bad publicity. An investigative report by Reuters said that one of the nation's biggest insurers, WellPoint, was targeting women with breast cancer for fraud investigations that could lead to rescissions.

Waas later won the Barlett & Steele Award for Business Investigative Reporting from the Walter Cronkite School at Arizona State University for his stories on WellPoint and other health insurance companies. He also won a second award by the Society of American Business Editors and Writers (SABEW) in the category of investigative reporting for reporting the same stories.

See also
Iran-Contra affair
Kenneth Starr
Watchdog journalism

References

Bibliography
Pertinent selected articles and books by Murray Waas
"Administration: The CIA Leak Investigation". Articles by Murray Waas in National Journal (2005–2007). Retrieved June 21, 2007.
"Articles by Murray Waas"  in The American Prospect (2001–2005). Retrieved June 21, 2007.
"Murray S. Waas" Archived articles in Salon. Retrieved June 21, 2007.
Waas, Murray, ed., with Jeff Lomonaco. The United States v. I. Lewis Libby. New York: Union Square Press (imprint of Sterling Publishing), 2007.  (10).  (13). ("Edited & with reporting by Murray Waas" and with research assistance by Jeff Lomonaco.)

Pertinent selected articles about and interviews of Waas
Baker, Russ W. "Iraqgate: The Big One That (Almost) Got Away: Who Chased It and Who Didn't". Columbia Journalism Review. (March/April 1993). Retrieved August 19, 2007.
Gootman, Elissa L. "Goldsmith Prizes Awarded: Top Investigative Reporting Teams Rewarded by $25,000". The Harvard Crimson. (March 26, 1993). Retrieved August 21, 2007.
Halloran, Liz. "A Muckraker's Day in the Sun". U.S. News & World Report. (May 15, 2006). Retrieved April 29, 2007.
Kurtz, Howard. "The Lone Ranger: After a Quarter Century in the Journalistic Shadows, Murray Waas Is Getting His Day in the Sun." The Washington Post, April 17, 2006. Retrieved June 20, 2007.
Lasica, J. D. "The Web: A New Channel for Investigative Journalism: Salon's Groundbreaking Stories on the Ken Starr Investigation Challenge the Conventional Wisdom Laid Down by the Mainstream Media's Wolfpack Mindset". American Journalism Review. (June 1998). Retrieved August 19, 2007.
Lewis, Anthony. "Abroad at Home; Trust". The New York Times. (October 26, 1992). Retrieved March 26, 2008.
–––. "Abroad at Home; Who Fed This Caesar?" The New York Times. (March 15, 1992). Retrieved March 26, 2008.
Rosen, Jay. "Murray Waas Is Our Woodward Now". PressThink (blog). (April 9, 2006). Retrieved June 20, 2007.
Sargent, Greg. "The Plame Game: What Murray Waas' Big Scoop May Really Tell us About Bush's Pre-war Deceptions". The American Prospect. (April 4, 2006). Retrieved August 20, 2007.
Schanberg, Sydney H. "Press Clips: If Old Journalism Dies... Where Will New Media Get the News?" The Village Voice. (November 29, 2005). Retrieved August 20, 2007.
Welch, Matt. "Salon's Coverage Commands Respect for Net Journalists". Online Journalism Review. (Annenberg School for Communication at USC). (March 30, 1998). Retrieved August 26, 2007.

External links
 Personal website (incomplete; under construction)
 Personal website (with articles by Waas)

1961 births
Living people
American investigative journalists
George Washington University alumni
Writers from Philadelphia
People from Washington, D.C.
People associated with the Plame affair